Saudi Arabia – United Arab Emirates relations refers to the current and historical relationship between Saudi Arabia and the United Arab Emirates. Saudi Arabia maintains an embassy in Abu Dhabi and a consulate in Dubai while the U.A.E. has an embassy in Riyadh and consulate in Jeddah. Both countries are neighbours and as part of the Middle East and Persian Gulf region, share extensive political and cultural ties.

The two countries are also known for being close allies in terms of foreign policy and geopolitical interests, collaborating closely during the 2017–18 Qatar diplomatic crisis and backing anti-Muslim Brotherhood governments in Libya, Tunisia and Egypt. However, the UAE and Saudi Arabia continue to take slightly differing stances on regional conflicts such the Yemeni Civil War, where the UAE opposes Al-Islah, and supports the Southern Movement (which has fought against Saudi-backed forces), Arab-Israeli normalizing, and the Syrian Civil War, where the UAE has reopened its embassy in Damascus.

Relations were briefly complicated by the tenure of Muhammad bin Nayef as Saudi Crown Prince, who had a poor relationship with UAE de facto ruler Mohammed bin Zayed Al Nahyan after the latter compared the former's father to an ape. However, relations have strengthened significantly with the rise of Mohammed bin Salman in Saudi Arabia, with Mohammed bin Zayed aiding his ascension to crown prince and serving as a "mentor" to the younger prince.

Timeline
In leaked emails from 2008, Emirati Ambassador to the United States Yousef Al Otaiba described Saudi leadership as "f***in' coo coo!" and that Emiratis had more "bad history" with the Kingdom of Saudi Arabia than other any country.

During the 2013–14 period, the United Arab Emirates reportedly hired the NSO Group, an Israeli cyber intelligence firm, to intercept the calls of Saudi Prince Mutaib bin Abdullah, then-minister of the National Guard, who was considered a contender for the Saudi throne at the time.

In 2014, Al-Saadi Gaddafi accused Abu Dhabi Crown Prince and de facto UAE leader Mohammed bin Zayed of close ties to an individual involved in a 2003 Libyan plot to assassinate then-Saudi Crown Prince Abdullah, contradicting Saudi claims that Qatar was involved in the plot.

In 2015, emails to former CIA Director David Petraeus, Otaiba disagreed with Petraeus on the utility of then-Saudi Crown Prince Mohammed bin Nayef, describing him as "a little off his game" and "not impressive, much less lucid".

During 2015, the United Arab Emirates hired lobbyists in the United States to promote Saudi defense minister Mohammed bin Salman.

In late 2015, Mohammed bin Nayef criticised Emirati interference in Saudi affairs, warning King Salman that Saudi Arabia faced a "dangerous conspiracy" involving a Mohammed bin Zayed-led "Emirati plot ... to help aggravate the differences within the royal court".

On an email dated 21 May 2017, Otaiba noted: "Abu Dhabi fought 200 years of wars with Saudi over Wahhabism. We have more bad history with Saudi than anyone. But with Mohammed bin Salman we see a genuine change. And that's why we're excited. We finally see hope there and we need it to succeed."

In May 2017, an unnamed source allegedly indicated that Mohammed bin Zayed and Mohammed bin Salman planned a joint Saudi-UAE invasion of Qatar which was ultimately abandoned due to opposition by the United States.

Otaiba received criticism in August 2017 from Saudi royals aligned with Mohammed bin Nayef after he claimed that the UAE and Saudi Arabia both desired more secular government in the Middle East which they saw as an implicit criticism of the Saudi status quo.

The United Arab Emirates backed Saudi Arabia in its August 2018 dispute with Canada.

By October 2018, UAE–Saudi relations had somewhat deteriorated, with Mohammed bin Salman reportedly privately accusing Mohammed bin Zayed of involvement in the assassination of Jamal Khashoggi to frame Saudi Arabia, and Mohammed bin Zayed described as expressing “disapproval” of his former protege.

In July 2019, the UAE withdrew most of its forces from the Saudi-led intervention in Yemen following  reported disagreements over the prospects of military victory, Emirati opposition to Islamist militias in northern Yemen, and Saudi support for Yemeni President Abdrabbuh Mansur Hadi.

Saudi intervention in Yemen
Saudi Arabia along with the UAE and other countries are currently involved in a major war in Yemen. Since the start of the war, many soldiers and civilians have died; moreover, schools and hospitals have been damaged by the Saudi-led coalition. 

The seven-year-old conflict in Yemen is among the worst in the world, due to widespread hunger, disease, and attacks on civilians. Peace efforts, however, gained momentum in April 2022, when the warring parties coordinated a two-month truce for the Islamic holy month of Ramadan.

Territorial disputes
Although the Saudi Arabia–United Arab Emirates border dispute was resolved in 1974, in August 2009 Saudi authorities prevented Emirati nationals from entering their territory using ID cards that showed a map including territory currently administered by Saudi Arabia. The UAE responded by claiming that the 1974 agreement was never ratified.

Israel–United Arab Emirates normalization efforts

Saudi Arabia, a major ally of the United Arab Emirates, has stayed silent on the issue of the possible peace agreement between UAE and Israel, though it quietly supports such an agreement. As the guardian of Islam's holy cities of Mecca and Medina, Saudi Arabia's pragmatic political stance regarding this historic change might be seen as part of its efforts to limit Iran's influence in the region.

Oil dispute
In July 2021 OPEC meetings, Saudi Arabia and the United Arab Emirates had disputed over oil price as Saudi Arabia-led deal to raise production beyond the cap set for early next year was blocked by the UAE. Saudi Arabia and the UAE later settled the difference with a compromise to unlock more oil supplies.

References

 
United Arab Emirates
Bilateral relations of the United Arab Emirates